NGC 1959 (also known as ESO 56-SC120) is an open cluster located in the Mensa constellation which is part of the Large Magellanic Cloud. It was discovered by John Herschel on December 23, 1834. Its apparent magnitude is 12.2, and its size is 0.50 arc minutes.

References

open clusters
ESO objects
1959
Mensa (constellation)
Large Magellanic Cloud
Astronomical objects discovered in 1834
Discoveries by John Herschel